Coldest place may refer to:

 The coldest place on earth, the Pole of Cold in Antarctica.
 The coldest temperatures seen in the known universe. See .

See also
List of weather records
The Coldest City